Darnell Osuagwu (born 29 December 1999) is a South African rugby union player for the  in the Currie Cup. His regular position is hooker.

Osuagwu was named in the  side for the 2022 Currie Cup Premier Division.

References

South African rugby union players
Living people
Rugby union hookers
Golden Lions players
1999 births
Falcons (rugby union) players